HMS K12 was a K class submarine built by Armstrong Whitworth, Newcastle upon Tyne. She was laid down in October 1915 and commissioned in August 1917.

K12 took part in the Battle of May Island, surviving the disastrous exercise. K12 was scrapped in 1926 in Charlestown.

Design
K12 displaced  when at the surface and  while submerged. The submarine was powered by two oil-fired Yarrow Shipbuilders boilers supplying one geared Brown-Curtis or Parsons steam turbine; this developed 10,500 ship horsepower (7,800 kW) to drive two  screws. Submerged power came from four electric motors each producing . It was also had an  diesel engine to be used when steam was being raised, or instead of raising steam.

K9 was armed with ten  torpedo tubes, two  deck guns, and a  anti-aircraft gun. Its torpedo tubes were fitted to the bows, the midship section, and two were mounted on the deck. Its complement was fifty-nine crew members.

References

Bibliography
 

 

British K-class submarines
Royal Navy ship names
Ships built on the River Tyne
1917 ships
Ships built by Armstrong Whitworth